Sir David fitz Walter of Cadzow or David fitz Walter fitz Gilbert de Hameldone, 2nd Laird of Cadzow (bef. 1346 – bef. 1378) was a Scottish nobleman.

The son of Walter fitz Gilbert of Cadzow, he succeeded his father as Baron of Cadzow before 1346, when he was captured at the Battle of Neville's Cross. He was considered an important enough captive to be held by William Zouche, Archbishop of York, under special terms that he not be released, except under command of Edward III of England. He is thought to have been knighted prior to the battle.

The next reference to David fitz Walter is in 1361 when he endowed Glasgow Cathedral with a Chaplainry.

In 1368, he received confirmation from the King, David II, of his patrimonial Lands of Cadzow and elsewhere, with the addition of the lands and tenantry of Eddlewood.

David fitz Walter took part in the sittings of the Parliament of Scotland in 1371 and 1373, the latter to confirm John Stewart, Earl of Carrick and his successors as heirs to the throne of Scotland. The charter, at New Register House in Edinburgh, still has his seal appended, with the three cinquefoils for Hamilton, and the inscription,: Sigill David filii Walter.

Marriage and issue
The name of David fitz Walter's spouse is not clear, many sources suggest that she was Margaret Leslie, daughter of Walter Leslie and Euphemia of Ross. By her he had at least five children:
David Hamilton of Cadzow
John Hamilton of Fingaltoun
Walter Hamilton- ancestor of the Hamiltons of Cambuskeith and Sanquhar
Alan Hamilton of Larbert
unknown daughter- married Simon Roberton of Earnock

References
Balfour Paul, Sir James, The Scots Peerage Vol IV. Edinburgh 1907 
The Peerage.com

14th-century births
14th-century deaths
Norman warriors
Scoto-Normans
People from South Lanarkshire
David

Year of birth unknown
Year of death unknown